The toubeleki, is a kind of a Greek traditional drum musical instrument. It is usually made from metal, open at its downside and covered with a skin stretched over it. It is played with the hands and used often in the Greek traditional folk rhythms, for the particularly cover of the Greek laiko and rebetiko music.

See also

Greek musical instruments
Greek folk music
Greek music
Goblet drum

References
Musipedia:, τουμπελέκι

Greek musical instruments
Greek music